Robert P. Aitken Farm House is an Italianate residence in Flint Township, Michigan.  The house was listed on the National Register of Historic Places on November 26, 1982.

Description
The house has several excellent qualities of the Italianate style.  The main portion of the house is two stories tall, with paired eavesline brackets, a hip roof, and a cupola.  The cupola has delicate scrollwork brackets in the corners, rounded arch windows, and paired brackets under the eaves.  The house has two additions with gable roofs and eyebrow windows, indicating Greek Revival architecture, so there is some speculation that those additions were earlier parts of the structure.

History

Robert P. Aitken (1819–1905) moved to Flint Township, Michigan from New York in 1842.  He married Sarah Johnstone, also from New York, in 1843.  The exact date of construction is not known, but is presumed to be after 1843.  Aitken was a successful farmer,  and a politician, serving as the supervisor of Flint Township and a representative to the Michigan Legislature.  The family had five daughters and five sons.  His son David D. Aitken (1853–1930) later operated the farm and served in the United States House of Representatives.

References

Buildings and structures in Flint, Michigan
Houses on the National Register of Historic Places in Michigan
Italianate architecture in Michigan
Houses in Genesee County, Michigan
National Register of Historic Places in Genesee County, Michigan